Robert Crais (pronounced ) (born June 20, 1953) is an American author of detective fiction. Crais began his career writing scripts for television shows such as Hill Street Blues, Cagney & Lacey, Quincy, Miami Vice and L.A. Law. His writing is influenced by Raymond Chandler, Dashiell Hammett, Ernest Hemingway, Robert B. Parker and John Steinbeck. Crais has won numerous awards for his crime novels. Lee Child has cited him in interviews as one of his favourite American crime writers.  The novels of Robert Crais have been published in 62 countries and are bestsellers around the world. Robert Crais received the Ross Macdonald Literary Award in 2006 and was named Grand Master by the Mystery Writers of America in 2014.

Biography
Born in Independence, Louisiana, he was adopted and raised as an only child. He attended Louisiana State University and studied mechanical engineering.

Crais moved to Hollywood in 1976 where he found work as a screenwriter for the television series Hill Street Blues, Cagney & Lacey and Miami Vice, and was nominated for an Emmy award.  Following the death of his father in 1985, Crais published the novel, The Monkey's Raincoat, which won the 1988 Anthony Award for "Best Paperback Original" and the 1988 Mystery Readers International Macavity Award for "Best First Novel". It has since been selected as one of the 100 Favorite Mysteries of the Century by the Independent Mystery Booksellers Association.

In 2006 Crais was awarded the Ross Macdonald Literary Award and in 2010 the Private Eye Writers of America's (PWA) Lifetime Achievement Award The Eye. In 2014 Crais received the Mystery Writers of America's (MWA) Grand Master Award.

Crais novels include:  Demolition Angel, Hostage, Suspect, and The Two-Minute Rule. Most of Crais' books feature the characters Elvis Cole and Joe Pike, with The Watchman (2007), The First Rule (2010) and The Sentry (2011) centering on Joe Pike. Taken is a 2012 detective novel by Robert Crais. It is the fifteenth in a series of linked novels centering on the character Elvis Cole.  The 2005 film, Hostage, was an adaptation of one of his books.

In 2020 his novel Suspect (2013) was named Best Mystery/Crime Novel of the Decade in the Barry Awards.

Bibliography

Elvis Cole/Joe Pike novels

Other novels

References

External links 
 
 
 Interview with Robert Crais, A DISCUSSION WITH National Authors on Tour TV Series, Episode #158 (1995)

Living people
American mystery writers
20th-century American novelists
Novelists from Louisiana
People from Independence, Louisiana
Writers from Los Angeles
1953 births
Anthony Award winners
Macavity Award winners
Shamus Award winners
Barry Award winners
Dilys Award winners
21st-century American novelists
American male novelists
20th-century American male writers
21st-century American male writers